The 2022 Sacramento Republic FC season is the club's ninth season of existence. The club played in the USL Championship (USL-C), the second tier of the American soccer pyramid. Sacramento Republic FC competed in the Western Conference of the USL Championship.

The season has been highlighted by Republic FC reaching the final of the U.S. Open Cup, becoming the first non-MLS club since 2008 to do so.

Competitions

USL Championship

Table

Match Results

USL Championship playoffs

Results

U.S. Open Cup

References

External links 

Sacramento Republic FC seasons
Sacramento Republic FC
Sacramento Republic FC
Sacramento Republic FC